Franziska Hentke (born 4 June 1989) is a German former butterfly swimmer.

Career
In July 2015, Hentke broke the German record in the 200-meter butterfly (long course) with a time of 2:05.26.

At the 2015 World Aquatics Championships in Kazan, Russia, she finished tied 4th in this event.

At the 2015 European Short Course Championships she won her first international title, in the 200 m butterfly. In the final she broke her own national record with a time of 2:03.01, making her the sixth fastest performer all-time in this event. She also competed in the 400 m individual medley, and finished 7th.

Hentke won her first international long-course title, in the 200 meter butterfly, at the 2016 European Aquatics Championships in London. She beat Hungarian Liliána Szilágyi by 0.01 s.

At the 2016 Summer Olympics, Hentke finished 11th in the semifinals of the 200 m butterfly and did not qualify for the final.

She finished 13th in the 200 m butterfly at the 2020 Summer Olympics and retired from swimming afterwards.

References

External links 
 
 
 
 
 

1989 births
Living people
People from Bitterfeld-Wolfen
People from Bezirk Halle
German female swimmers
Sportspeople from Saxony-Anhalt
German female butterfly swimmers
Medalists at the FINA World Swimming Championships (25 m)
Swimmers at the 2016 Summer Olympics
Olympic swimmers of Germany
World Aquatics Championships medalists in swimming
20th-century German women
Swimmers at the 2020 Summer Olympics
21st-century German women